Starčevo is a town located in the Pančevo municipality, in the South Banat District of Serbia. It is situated in the Autonomous Province of Vojvodina. The town has a Serb ethnic majority and its population is 7,473 people (2011 census).

The name of the town means "the place of the old man" in Serbian (starac, "elder"). The Neolithic Starčevo culture was named after the Starčevo site.

Demographics (2002 census)

Ethnic groups in the town:
Serbs = 6,205
Croats = 349
Yugoslavs = 204
Hungarians = 111
others

Historical population

Gallery

See also
Starčevo-Körös
List of places in Serbia
List of cities, towns and villages in Vojvodina

References

Slobodan Ćurčić, Broj stanovnika Vojvodine, Novi Sad, 1996.

External links

Official website of Starčevo
Satellite map of Starčevo

Pančevo
Populated places in Serbian Banat
Populated places in South Banat District
Archaeological sites in Serbia
Populated places established in the 6th millennium BC
Towns in Serbia
Starčevo–Körös–Criș culture